Pseudosophronia constanti is a moth of the family Gelechiidae. It was described by Jacques Nel in 1998. It is found in France.

References

Moths described in 1998
Anacampsini